The lac Allioux is a freshwater body located northeast in of Quebec City, in the unorganized territory of Lac-Jacques-Cartier, in the La Côte-de-Beaupré Regional County Municipality, in the administrative region of Capitale-Nationale, in the province of Quebec, in Canada. This body of water is part of the Laurentides Wildlife Reserve.

The hydrographic side of Lac Allioux is served by a secondary forest road for forestry purposes. Forestry is the main economic activity in this valley; recreational tourism, second.

Because of the altitude, the surface of Lake Allioux is generally frozen from the end of November to the beginning of April; however, safe circulation on the ice is generally done from the beginning of December until the beginning of April.

Geography 
Lac Allioux is located near the southeastern limit of the Laurentides Wildlife Reserve. Its mouth is located at:
  west of Savane Lake (Lac-Pikauba) which empties north into the rivière Savane du Nord;
  north-east of the course of the Rivière des Neiges;
  north of the confluence of the Sainte-Anne River and the Saint Lawrence river;
  southwest of downtown Baie-Saint-Paul.

This lake is mainly fed by two streams (coming from the east), a stream coming from the south, a stream (coming from the west) and the discharge of a set of lakes including Mornay, Sifrine, MacLeod and Petit lac MacLeod.

From the mouth of Lac Allioux, the current first descends on  towards the north by the Green stream which crosses Lake Bignell; on  towards the south-east following the course of an unidentified stream; on  first towards the south-east, the south, then the south-west, following the course of the Sainte-Anne River, which crosses downtown Beaupré, to the northwest shore of the Saint Lawrence River.

Toponymy 
Since 1929, this body of water has been locally designated "Lac Vert" on geographic maps. In 1943, the Commission de géographie du Québec assigned it the designation "Lac Allioux". This toponym evokes Vincent Allioux (Vannes, France, 1698 - 1735) who came to New France around 1721. He taught hydrography at the Collège de Québec until 1729; then returned to France to study theology. He returned to Quebec in 1734 as a Jesuit priest. Recalled in France for family reasons, he left the Company of Jesus in 1735. The Jesuits had been teaching hydrography since 1671, but it was not until 1708 that they were officially commissioned by the king.

The toponym "Lac Allioux" was formalized on December 5, 1968, at the Place Names Bank of the Commission de toponymie du Québec.

Notes and references

See also

Related article 
 Charlevoix Regional County Municipality
 Lac-Jacques-Cartier, an unorganized territory
 Laurentides Wildlife Reserve
 Sainte-Anne River (Beaupré)
 St. Lawrence River

External links 

Lakes of Capitale-Nationale
La Côte-de-Beaupré Regional County Municipality
Laurentides Wildlife Reserve